Today is an American R&B vocal group formed in 1988. The group comprised Frederick Lee "Bubba" Drakeford, Larry "Chief" Singletary, Wesley "Wes" Adams, and Larry "Love" McCain, childhood friends from Englewood, New Jersey.

History
The group started in 1984 as The Gents and comprised Drakeford, McCain, William McNeir, Ronald Scruggs, and Bernard Belle. During an anti-drug benefit, the group received a meeting with the producer Teddy Riley who renamed the group Today and melded them into the current lineup. Riley helped them receive a deal with MCA Records.

As the head of MCA records urban department, Jheryl Busby, moved into Motown, he brought several acts with him, including Today, The Boys and The Good Girls. While touring the country, the groups were successful. Motown promoted Today as the new Four Tops, and The Boys and The Good Girls were promoted as the new Jackson 5 and new Supremes respectively.

Today released their self-titled debut album in 1988. The single "Him Or Me" reached #3 on the R&B charts and was followed by "Girl I Got My Eyes On You" which reached #1. It was also their only song to chart in Britain, and peaked at #94 on the UK Singles Chart in early 1989. Yet the album's later singles did not do as well as their early showings, and they began to resent the way they were being produced and promoted.

Riley did not help the group with their second album, The New Formula. Released in 1990, the album manage to chart three singles: "Why You Get Funky on Me", which was also featured in the movie House Party reached #2 on the R&B charts. "I Got The Feeling" peaked at #12 on Billboard's Hot R&B/Hip-Hop Songs chart and "I Wanna Come Back Home" peaked at #46 on the Hot R&B/Hip-Hop Songs chart.

After the group broke up, Drakeford started a solo career as Big Bub while Singletary, Adams, and McCain wrote songs and tried unsuccessfully to get a deal as a trio. Drakeford released three albums as a solo artist: 1992's Comin at Cha (EastWest), 1997's Timeless (Kedar/Universal), and 2000's Never Too Late (Flavor Unit). His single "Need Your Love", credited to Big Bub feat. Queen Latifah & Heavy D, peaked at #70 on the Billboard Hot 100 in 1997.

In 2010, it was announced that all four members reunited and were changing to the Gospel music genre and would work on a new album and a new single "Orchestrate" was released.

Discography

Studio albums

Singles

References

External links

Today (band) on R&B Haven

African-American musical groups
American rhythm and blues musical groups
American boy bands
Motown artists
New jack swing music groups
Vocal quartets